Rosa Mercedes Ayarza de Morales (July 8, 1881 – May 2, 1969) was a Peruvian composer.

External link

People from Lima
1881 births
1969 deaths
Peruvian composers